Juan Amador Sánchez (born 26 January 1961) is an Argentine football player and manager. A defender, he played for ten clubs during his career, all in his native Argentina.

Managerial career
Sánchez started his managerial career with Club Atlético San Telmo. In 2003, he was appointed head coach of the Haiti national football team, a position he held until 2003. After that, he coached Club Almagro, Club Guaraní, Club Universitario de Deportes, Club Atlético Platense, S.D. Aucas, Atlético de Rafaela, Talleres de Córdoba, Boca Unidos, Club Atlético Huracán, C.D. Olmedo, Defensores de Belgrano, San Martín de Tucumán, Chaco For Ever, and Manta.

References

External links

 
 Juan Amador Sánchez: "The Haitian is a very suffered and mistreated people"
 Juan Amador Sánchez: "If the coach has a team, he should file details" 
 Juan Amador Sánchez: "Haitians do not hit and are innocent" 
 JUAN AMADOR SANCHEZ, AN ALL FOOTBALL FIELD 
 Juan Amador's dream

1961 births
Living people
Argentine footballers
Argentine football managers
People from Iriondo Department
Association football defenders
Club Atlético Huracán footballers
Boca Juniors footballers
Club Atlético Platense footballers
Club Atlético River Plate footballers
Atlético de Rafaela footballers
Unión de Santa Fe footballers
San Martín de Tucumán footballers
Atlético Tucumán footballers
Nueva Chicago footballers
Deportivo Morón footballers
Argentine Primera División players
Primera Nacional players
Haiti national football team managers
Almagro managers
Club Guaraní managers
Club Universitario de Deportes managers
Club Atlético Platense managers
S.D. Aucas managers
Atlético de Rafaela managers
Talleres de Córdoba managers
Boca Unidos managers
Club Atlético Huracán managers
C.D. Olmedo managers
Defensores de Belgrano managers
San Martín de Tucumán managers
Argentine Primera División managers
Primera B Nacional managers
Torneo Federal A managers
Paraguayan Primera División managers
Peruvian Primera División managers
Argentine expatriate football managers
Expatriate football managers in Haiti
Expatriate football managers in Paraguay
Argentine expatriate sportspeople in Paraguay
Expatriate football managers in Peru
Argentine expatriate sportspeople in Peru
Expatriate football managers in Ecuador
Argentine expatriate sportspeople in Ecuador
Sportspeople from Santa Fe Province